Lee Jones may refer to:

Lee Jones (author), poker author and former cardroom manager for PokerStars
Lee Jones (footballer, born 1970), Welsh footballer, goalkeeper
Lee Jones (footballer, born 1973), Welsh footballer, striker 
Lee Jones (footballer, born 1975), New Zealand international football (soccer) player
Lee Jones (golfer) (1874-1937), American golfer
Lee Jones (rugby union) (born 1988), of Edinburgh Rugby and Scotland national rugby union team
Lee Jones, star of The Bastard Executioner
Lee Jones, director and/or producer of drive-in films like The Hidan of Maukbeiangjow and Supervan